Thoroton is a small English parish in the borough of Rushcliffe, Nottinghamshire, with a population of 112. The village has conservation area status. Its Anglican parish church is a Grade I listed building.

Geography
It is bounded by an originally Roman road, the Fosse Way – A46 –  to the west, the A1  to the east, and the A52  further south.

Thoroton belongs under Rushcliffe Borough Council. Since December 2019, the member of Parliament for the Rushcliffe constituency, to which Thoroton belongs, is the Conservative Ruth Edwards.

Heritage
Thoroton was granted conservation area status in 1974. It is served by the medieval Anglican St Helena's Church, which is a Grade I listed building. There is a service held once a month.

The place name seems to contain an Old Norse personal name Þurferð + tūn (Old English), an enclosure; a farmstead; a village; an estate; thus "Farm of a man called Thurferth". There are 19 such place names (a Scandinavian personal name followed by tūn ) in Nottinghamshire, all of them in the Domesday survey, and all apparently ancient villages.

Charles Falconer, Baron Falconer of Thoroton takes his name from part of his wife's name, whose family home is near Thoroton. The Falconers also own property in the village itself, which is let.

Transport
Thoroton is served by buses to Bottesford, Bingham and nearby villages on Tuesdays and to Newark-on-Trent, Bottesford and nearby villages on Wednesdays.

The nearest railway station is at Aslockton (2.2 miles/3.5 km). It offers regular services between Nottingham and Grantham or Skegness.

Amenities
The nearest primary school to the village is at Orston (2 miles/3.5 km). Secondary education is available in Bingham and Newark-on-Trent.

St Helena's Church has parts dating back to the 11th century. It belongs to the Cranmer group of Anglican parishes and has a service at 9 a.m. on the second Sunday of the month.

There are shopping, medical and other services at Newark-on-Trent (9 miles/14.5 km), Bingham (6 miles/10 km) and Bottesford (5 miles/8 km). The nearest public houses are the Cranmer Arms in Aslockton (2 miles/3.2 km) and the Durham Ox in Orston. Both serve meals, as does Orston's Limehaus café. Accommodation is available in Bingham and Elton on the Hill (4 miles/6.5 km).

References

External links

Civil parishes in Nottinghamshire
Villages in Nottinghamshire
Rushcliffe